Aaron William Summers (born 24 March 1996) is an Australian former cricketer. He made his Twenty20 debut for Hobart Hurricanes in the 2017–18 Big Bash League season on 21 December 2017. He made his List A debut for Tasmania in the 2018–19 JLT One-Day Cup on 19 September 2018.

In July 2019, he was selected to play for the Belfast Titans in the inaugural edition of the Euro T20 Slam cricket tournament. However, the following month the tournament was cancelled.

In December 2020, it was announced that Summers would play in the 2020–21 Pakistan Cup, becoming the first Australian cricketer to play in a domestic cricket competition in Pakistan, after signing with Southern Punjab.

In May 2021, after playing professionally and working in Darwin, Summers was arrested and charged in relation to seven counts of grooming and possessing child abuse material. In December 2021, after pleading guilty, he was jailed for 3 years and 11 months, and was registered as a sex offender.

References

External links
 

1996 births
Living people
Australian cricketers
Cricketers from Perth, Western Australia
Hobart Hurricanes cricketers
Tasmania cricketers
Southern Punjab (Pakistan) cricketers
People convicted of child pornography offenses